A women's wing is an organisation affiliated with a political party that consists of that party's female membership or acts to promote women within a party. The organisations take different roles and types, with some giving women the option of joining and others automatically enrolling all female party members in their women's wings. The intention is to encourage women to join formal party structures.

See also
 Youth wing
 Student wing

Footnotes

Political terminology